Mereküla, Meriküla, or variations may refer to several places in Estonia:
Mereküla, Pärnu County
Meriküla, Harju County
Meriküla, Ida-Viru County
Merekülä, a village in Võru County